The 2003 Zamfara State gubernatorial election occurred on April 19, 2003. ANPP candidate Ahmad Sani Yerima won the election, defeating PDP Bala Mande and 3 other candidates.

Results
Ahmad Sani Yerima from the ANPP won the election. 5 candidates contested in the election.

The total number of registered voters in the state was 1,515,622, total votes cast was 1,099,050, valid votes was 1,047,734 and rejected votes was 51,316.

Ahmad Sani Yerima, (ANPP)- 829,954

Bala Mande, PDP- 210,143

Bello Umar, APGA- 6,790

Garba Mohammed Gajam, UNPP- 463

Sahabi Aliyu, NDP- 384

References 

Zamfara State gubernatorial election
Zamfara State gubernatorial election

2003